Andalò del Negro (Genoa, 1260 – Naples, 1334) was a medieval Italian astronomer and geographer.

In 1318 he joined the retinue of Robert of Anjou, who was then in Genoa, and spent the rest of his life attached to the Angevin court in Naples, where he became friends with Boccaccio.

Bibliography
 Introductorius ad iudicia astrologie
 Opus praeclarissimum astrolabii
 De operatione quadrantis
 Tractatus spherae

13th-century Italian astronomers
1260 births
1334 deaths
14th-century Italian astronomers